"Quel filou" is a song by Austrian singer, songwriter, and actress Zoë (full name Zoë Straub). The song was released as a digital download on 15 March 2015 through ORF-Enterprise. It has peaked at number 23 in Austria, and was written by Zoë and Christof Straub. The song competed in Wer singt für Österreich? 2015, where it placed third.

Live performances
Zoë performed the song live for the first time during the third show of Wer singt für Österreich? 2015, where it was selected as her entry into the competition. She performed the song again during the fourth show, where it placed third out of six, coming second with the jury vote and third with the televote.

Track listing

Chart performance

Weekly charts

Release history

References

2015 debut singles
2015 songs
Zoë Straub songs
French-language songs